Petersham Rugby Union Football Club is a rugby union club based in the inner west of Sydney, New South Wales. The club, also known as "The Shammies", currently field 5 teams in the 1st Grade Division of the New South Wales Suburban Rugby Union competition (Subbies). Petersham RUFC was founded in 1883, making it the oldest surviving suburban rugby club in Australia.

History

Early years: 1883–1907
The Sydney rugby institution that is the Petersham Football Club first took to the playing fields in the winter of 1883.  At that time, Sydney club rugby was organised on two levels, known simply as Senior and Junior. The Senior club competition had been running since 1874, but Junior contests prior to the mid-1880s were somewhat disorganised. In fact, the Southern Rugby Union only started involving itself in Junior rugby in 1882, and did not get around to establishing a formal competition for Junior clubs until 1886. By that time Petersham had affiliated to the Union, and was a participant in that first official second tier competition.

Over the next few years Junior football continued to grow in popularity, and the new competition had to be regularly expanded to accommodate a rapidly increasing number of clubs. Petersham became entrenched at the top level and contested every First Junior competition from 1886 to 1895, winning it in 1889 and making the semi-finals on four other occasions. During this period the club also boasted an impressive role of Junior representative players and supplied a steady stream of quality footballers to the Senior competition. Two of these, Arthur Braund and Rush Nelson, later went on to play many tests for New South Wales and, in the latter case, Queensland.

By the late 1890s however, the Sydney rugby scene was changing. In 1897 a new body, the Metropolitan Rugby Union, had been formed to oversee the Sydney club competitions. A natural consequence of this was the extinction of a large number of Junior clubs, and indeed by the start of the 1898 season over twenty founding members of the new union, including the entire Fourth Junior competition, had disappeared from its books. Petersham, who had been suffering from a drain of quality players to the Senior competition anyway, was a more significant and probably unintended casualty of this policy.

Fortunately however, the club was strong enough to survive the setback. While most of the Junior clubs disenfranchised by the Metropolitan Rugby Union from 1897 to 1900 simply ceased to exist, a few, including Petersham, continued to play amongst themselves outside the jurisdiction of the Metropolitan and New South Wales Rugby Unions. This competition was formalised in 1901 as the City and Suburban Association, the direct ancestor of modern Subbies rugby. Petersham is the only surviving founding member of that competition - the basis of our claim to be Australia's oldest Subbies club! Petersham played in the new competition from 1901 to 1905, winning it in 1904.

In 1906, Petersham followed the example of previous City and Suburban premiers and switched to the Metropolitan Rugby Union's Borough competition, which had been established in 1902 to counter the threat of the new rebel union. Petersham played in the Borough competition for two years, until it was discontinued at the end of the 1907 season. At this time the club ceased operation for the first time since its inception, and there follows a gap of some years before becoming one of the first Sydney clubs to reform after the Great War. This is the only discontinuity in the history of the club.

Subbies: 1919–1945
The re-establishment of New South Wales rugby in 1919 saw the New South Wales Rugby Union establish a new combined competition. Petersham rapidly rose to prominence, being promoted to First Grade in 1922. Unfortunately the club's only flirtation with senior rugby was anything but auspicious, with its only two competition points coming from a final round forfeit by Sydney University Football Club. Consequently, Petersham was dropped to Third Grade, which they immediately won, and were subsequently reinstated to the Reserve Grade B competition. The Kentwell Cup had been presented to the winners of this competition for the first time the previous year, and so began Petersham's long association with that coveted trophy.

In 1929, the New South Wales Rugby Union split its competition in two, forming separate District and Non-District competitions. Petersham stayed with the Non-District competition, which was reconstituted in 1933 as the Metropolitan Sub-District Rugby Union. In 1934 Petersham won the Kentwell Cup for the first time, defeating Roseville in the grand final. At this time the New South Wales Rugby Union was looking fill a vacancy in the District competition, and so dominant were the Petersham and Roseville clubs that it was decided whichever of them won the Kentwell Cup in 1935 should be promoted forthwith. Needless to say the pair met in the grand final once more, but this time Roseville took the honours. They subsequently merged with Chatswood and Gordon to form the Gordon District Rugby Club. Petersham remained in Subbies.

Ron McLean patronage: 1946–1992
After the Second World War, Petersham came under the patronage of the famous and mercurial Ron McLean, a veritable legend of Subbies rugby. Ron first pulled on a boot for Petersham in 1935, and later went on to serve as club president and secretary for a total of 47 years. His contributions to the club were manifest, but probably the most significant was the instigation of the famous Petersham World Tour. Petersham had been a touring club since the 1880s, but in 1967 it became the first club side in world rugby history to actually circle the globe on a football tour. The feat has been repeated on numerous occasions since, and the various touring sides have boasted many prominent New South Wales and Australian representative players.

In 1971, the Sydney Sub-District Rugby Union was established and was reorganised over three divisions. Petersham entered the 1st Division, and in 1972 made the Kentwell Cup grand final for the third time, only to lose it to Hunters Hill. However they made up for it with a win over Lindfield in 1973, then backed up to exact vengeance on the black and white hoops in 1974. This side included many top quality players, and is one of only a small number ever to win back to back Kentwells. At the end of 1974 however, an internal dispute saw many of the dual premiership players leave the club, and within two years Petersham had dropped to 3rd Division. Thus began a long period of exile in the lower divisions. This was a tough time for the club, and ultimately saw it on the verge of extinction. However a century of rugby breeds resilience, and tough times seem to bring out the best in Petersham.

Modern club: 1993 to present
The 1993 season saw both a committee reshuffle and an influx of new players. Over the next couple of years the club progressed steadily, and eventually found itself back up in 3rd Division in 1996. There followed a period of success, winning the Campbell Cup in 1997, the Farrant and Nicholson Cups in 1999 and the Clark, Farrant and joint Campbell Cups in 2000. The latter year also saw the club win the Keith Harris Shield for the 3rd Division club championship and achieve promotion to 2nd Division.

The sojourn in 2nd Division was not as successful as would have been hoped however, as the club gradually lost its recent momentum and started to slide. The period had its highlights, in particular the establishment of a highly successful U21 Colts team, but overall the club failed to live up to expectations. The adventure ultimately came to an end in 2005 after a disastrous run of injuries and plain old bad luck finally took its toll and saw Petersham relegated back to 3rd Division.

2006 was a much more successful year, with the club returning to winning form. 3rd Grade and 4th Grade both made the finals with the 3rd XV subsequently winning the Campbell Cup over Blue Mountains in one of the biggest grand final upsets of 2006. This was followed in 2007 by Farrant and Nicholson Cups.

2008 was celebrated with Petersham Rugby's 125th anniversary.  The multitude of off-field events celebrating the club's historic milestone was manifested with success on field with all four grades showcasing in the 3rd division grand finals in poor weather conditions in Sydney. Petersham won the Farrant and Campbell cups that day, however the entire 5 grades celebrated the history of their club.

Colours 
The original 19th century colours of the Petersham RUFC are described as "Bismarck and Coral, 4 in. bars".

These colours were used from the club's inception in 1883 up until the disbanding of the Metropolitan Rugby Union Borough Competition at the end of 1907. After the World War I, the club reformed and played initially in Dark Green. This strip was eventually overshadowed by the Myrtle Green of Randwick however, and so when Petersham joined the newly formed New South Wales Rugby Union Non-District Competition in 1929, the colours were changed to the modern "Sky Blue and Maroon, 4 in. bars" in deference to the playing colours of the New South Wales and Queensland Rugby Unions:

Nearly eight decades later, the only other change has been the addition of the famous Waratah flower crest of New South Wales (the only suburban club sanctioned to do so), emblazoned with the club's founding date of 1883.

Premierships 
Petersham has won premierships and club championships across multiple competitions since 1889:

NSW Suburban Rugby Union - 1st Division
2018 - Kentwell Cup Winners
2017 - Kentwell Cup Winners
2017 - Club Champions
2017 - Barbour Cup Winners

NSW Suburban Rugby Union - 2nd Division
2013 - Club Champions
2013 - Stockdale Cup Winner
2013 - Blunt Cup Winner

NSW Suburban Rugby Union - 3rd Division
2009 - 2nd Grade Farrant Cup
2008 - 2nd Grade Farrant Cup, 3rd Grade Campbell Cup
2007 - 2nd Grade Farrant Cup, 4th Grade Nicholson Cup
2006 - 3rd Grade Campbell Cup
2000 - Club Champions: Keith Harris Shield, 1st Grade Clark Cup,  3rd Grade Campbell Cup (joint premiers)
1999 - 2nd Grade Farrant Cup, 4th Grade Nicholson Cup
1997 - 3rd Grade Campbell Cup

Sydney Sub-District Rugby Union - 3rd Division
1988 - 3rd Grade Walker Cup
1984 - 2nd Grade Farrant Cup

Metropolitan Sub-District Rugby Union
1974 - 1st Grade Kentwell Cup
1973 - 1st Grade Kentwell Cup, 4th Grade Judd Cup
1967 - 2nd Grade Burke Cup
1961 - 4th Grade Premiers
1956 - 2nd Grade Burke Cup
1934 - 1st Grade Kentwell Cup
1933 - 2nd Grade Burke Cup
New South Wales Rugby Union
1923  - 3rd Grade Premiers
City and Suburban Association
1904  - Premiers
Southern Rugby Union
1889  - Metropolitan 1st Junior Premiers

Life members

Brett Conroy
Marty Davis
Richard Harvey
Thomas Jones
Dave Kelly

Greg Matsin
Andrew McKinney
Kent Prusas
Matthew Robinson
Paul Stokoe

Representative players
The following Petersham players have been selected for representative honours:

New South Wales Suburban Rugby Union
 2007 Dave Sato, Monty Simes (U19)
 1992 Johnny McCabe

Sydney Sub-District Rugby Union
 1974 Geoff Foster, Keith Scott, Shayne Wolfe
 1973 Geoff Foster, Shayne Wolfe
 1972 Shayne Wolfe

Metropolitan Sub-District Rugby Union
 1968 Harry Potts

Metropolitan Sub-District Rugby Union Combined Kentwell Cup
 1934 F. Cowley, J. Jacobs

Southern Rugby Union Combined Junior Competitions
 1895 T.G. Bate, T.O. Dadswell, G.A. McMahon, E. Newton, C. Oake
 1894 T.O. Dadswell, H. Faunce, A. Fredericks, W. Perry
 1893 Crowe Kelk, A.E. Moore, E. Newton, W. Perry
 1892 H. Blanchard Scouller
 1891 A. Clarkson, W.C. Kerr, A.E. Moore
 1890 F. Newman, W. Smith
 1889 B. Fitzpatrick Lister, R.G. Maiden, H. Nelson, S.J. Simpson

Player milestones
300 Games
 Marty Davis, Richard Harvey, Dave Kelly, Paul Stokoe, Andrew McKinney, Greg Matsin

200 Games
 Adam Dunn, Matt Robinson, Gerry Schiemer, Danny Zachariou

Coaching Awards 
 2013 NSW Suburban Rugby Union : Coach of the Year : Lord Steve 'Snicks' Nicholls (Petersham, 2nd Division, 1st Grade)
 2018 NSW Suburban Rugby Union : Coach of the Year : Lord Steve 'Snicks' Nicholls (Petersham, 1st Division, 1st Grade)
 2019 NSW Suburban Rugby Union : Coach of the Year : Lord Steve 'Snicks' Nicholls (Petersham, 1st Division, 1st Grade)
 2020 NSW Suburban Rugby Union : Coach of the Year : Lord Steve 'Snicks' Nicholls (Petersham, 1st Division, 1st Grade)
 2021 NSW Suburban Rugby Union : Coach of the Year : Lord Steve 'Snicks' Nicholls (Petersham, 1st Division, 1st Grade) (Note: First and only man in human history to achieve 4 'NSW Suburban Rugby Union : Coach of the Year' awards consecutively)

Location 
Training and home games take place at Camperdown Oval, located between Mallett St and Australia St at Camperdown, just south of Parramatta Rd. The nearest train station is Newtown Station, about a 10-minute walk south down Australia St.

Training takes place on Monday and Thursday evenings from 6.30pm. After match and training functions reconvene at sponsor pub The Toxteth Hotel, Glebe.

References

External links 
Petersham Rugby Official Site
Petersham Junior RUFC
NSW Suburban Rugby Union Official Site

Rugby union teams in Sydney
Rugby clubs established in 1883
1883 establishments in Australia
Petersham, New South Wales